Antonio "Toto" Santos Maria da Costa (born 9 August 1973) is an Angolan former footballer who played as a forward.

Career
Born in Luanda, Da Costa played with RBC Roosendaal of the Dutch Eerste Divisie for the 1995/96 and 1996/97 seasons, Da Costa provided a hat-trick on his debut in December 1995.

He signed a two-season deal with Melbourne Knights of the National Soccer League in winter 2000. He found it hard at first to get used to the physical oriented game in Australia compared to the tactical style he was accustomed to in Europe. Considering this, the Luanda native stated that the National Soccer League was underrated in its quality but left the Knights in summer 2002 to seek opportunities in the Netherlands.

Despite being pensive over the fact that his family was not in Australia with him, he claimed that he liked life in the country.

References

External links 
 
 at ZeroZero

1973 births
Living people
Footballers from Luanda
Angolan footballers
Association football forwards
Angolan emigrants to Portugal
Angolan expatriate footballers
Expatriate footballers in the Netherlands
National Soccer League (Australia) players
Expatriate footballers in Belgium
Expatriate soccer players in Australia
Eerste Divisie players
Melbourne Knights FC players
FC Eindhoven players
RBC Roosendaal players